Arm in Arm Down the Street or Del brazo y por la calle in Spanish may refer to:

Arm in Arm Down the Street (play), a play by Armando Mook
Arm in Arm Down the Street (1956 film), a 1956 Mexican film
Arm in Arm Down the Street (1966 film), a 1966 Argentine film